A Government House is any residence used by Governors-General, Governors and Lieutenant-Governors in the Commonwealth and the British Empire. Government Houses serve as the venue for Governors’ official business, as well as the many receptions and functions hosted by the occupant. Sometimes, the term Government House is used as a metonym for the Governor or his office.

While a Government House is the official residence of a viceroy or governor who represents the monarch, many Commonwealth nations now operate without the British Monarch as Head of State. To avoid confusion, several of these nations refer to their presidential palaces as a State House or President's House.

When King Charles III or a member of the Royal Family visits a Commonwealth nation, they will often stay at the Government House, which is reported in the Court Circular. This privilege is sometimes extended to other dignitaries, but usually arrangements are made for important non-royal visitors to be accommodated at hotels, or in accommodations provided by their own country's embassy or consulate.

Africa

Bechuanaland, Government House of the Bechuanaland Protectorate
British East Africa, Government House of Kenya
Buganda, Government House of the Uganda Protectorate
Egypt, Consul-General's Residence, Cairo
Gambia, Government House of Gambia
Gold Coast, Osu Castle
Mauritius, Government House of Mauritius, Chateau de Reduit
Nigeria, Government House of Nigeria
Northern Rhodesia, Government House of Northern Rhodesia
Nyasaland, Government House of Nyasaland
Sierra Leone, Government House of Sierra Leone
Southern Rhodesia, Government House of Southern Rhodesia
Bulawayo, Government House, Bulawayo
Sudan, Government House of Sudan
Tanganyika, Government House of Tanganyika

South Africa
South Africa, Government Houses of South Africa
Transvaal Colony, Government House, Pretoria
Cape Colony, De Tuynhuys, Cape Town
Orange Free State, Government House, Bloemfontein
Natal, Government House of Natal

Americas

Atlantic 
Bermuda, Government House of Bermuda
Falkland Islands, Government House of the Falkland Islands
Saint Helena, Plantation House and The Castle

Canada

Canada, Government Houses in Canada
Ottawa, Rideau Hall
Quebec City, Citadelle of Quebec
Alberta, Government House of Alberta
British Columbia, Government House of British Columbia
Manitoba, Government House of Manitoba
New Brunswick, Government House of New Brunswick
Newfoundland and Labrador, Government House of Newfoundland & Labrador
Nova Scotia, Government House of Nova Scotia
Ontario, demolished, now uses suites in the Ontario Legislative Building
Prince Edward Island, Government House of Prince Edward Island
Quebec, demolished, now uses suites in the Parliament Building
Saskatchewan, Government House of Saskatchewan

Caribbean and the West Indies

Anguilla, Government House of Anguilla
Antigua and Barbuda, Government House of Antigua & Barbuda
Bahamas, Government House of The Bahamas
Barbados, Government House of Barbados, now called the State House after the monarchy was abolished.
Belize, Government House of British Honduras
British Virgin Islands, Government House of the British Virgin Islands
Cayman Islands, Government House of the Cayman Islands
Dominica, Government House of Dominica
Grenada, Government House of Grenada
Jamaica, King's House
Montserrat, Government House of Montserrat
Saint Lucia, Government House of Saint Lucia
Saint Vincent and the Grenadines, Government House of Saint Vincent & The Grenadines
Saint Kitts and Nevis, Government House of Saint Christopher-Nevis-Anguilla
Trinidad and Tobago, Government House of Trinidad and Tobago
Turks & Caicos Islands, Government House of Turks & Caicos Islands

South America

Guyana, Government House of British Guiana

Asia

Burma, Government House, Rangoon
Ceylon, Queen's House
Ceylon, Governor's Pavilion
Ceylon, Queen's Cottage
Hong Kong, Government House of Hong Kong
Malaya, Carcosa and King's House (Carcosa Seri Negara)
Maldives, Government House of Maldives
Singapore, Government House of Singapore

British Indian Empire

 Residences of the Viceroy of India
 Viceroy's House, New Delhi
 Government House, Kolkata
 Viceregal Lodge, Shimla
 Peterhoff, Shimla

Other government residences 
 Belvedere Estate, Kolkata
 Flagstaff House, New Delhi, official residence of the Commander-in-Chief British Indian Army.
 Governor's House, Dhaka
 Government House, Darjeeling
 Lalitha Mahal, Palace of the Mysore State (guest house) in Mysore
 Ajmer-Merwara State, Government House of Ajmer-Merwara in Ajmer
 Assam Province, Government House of Assam in Shillong
 Balochistan Province, Government House of Balochistan in Quetta
 Bengal Presidency, Government House of Bengal in Kolkata
 Bihar Province, Government House of Bihar in Patna
 Bombay Presidency, Government House of Bombay in Mumbai
 Central Provinces and Berar, Government House of Central Provinces & Berar in Nagpur
 Coorg State, Government House of Coorg in Kodagu
 Eastern Bengal and Assam Province, Government House of Eastern Bengal and Assam in Dhaka
 Madras Presidency, Guindy Lodge in Chennai
 Northwest Frontier Province, Government House of Northwest Frontier in Peshawar
 Orissa Province, Government House of Orissa in Cuttack
 Punjab Province, Government House of Punjab in Lahore
 Sindh Province, Government House of Sindh in Karachi
 United Provinces of Agra and Oudh, Government House of the United Provinces of Agra and Oudh in Lucknow

Middle East
Palestine, Jerusalem

Europe
Cyprus, Presidential Palace, Nicosia
Gibraltar, The Convent
Guernsey, Government House of Guernsey
Isle of Man, Government House of the Isle of Man
Jersey, Government House of Jersey
Malta
Governor's Palace
San Anton Palace

Ireland
Pre-independence, the living arrangements of the Lord Lieutenant of Ireland varied according to the social calendar:
 The Viceregal Lodge, the "out of season" residence of the Lord Lieutenant, Phoenix Park, Dublin.
 The State Apartments, Dublin Castle. The "Castle season" residence of the Lord Lieutenant.
After 1922, the Viceregal Lodge served as the official residence of the first two Governors-General of the Irish Free State.
The Governor of Northern Ireland resided in Hillsborough Castle, which is, since 1973, the official residence of the Northern Ireland Secretary.

Pacific

Australia 

Australia, Government Houses of Australia
Canberra, Government House (commonly known as Yarralumla)
Sydney, Admiralty House
New South Wales, Government House of New South Wales
Northern Territory, Government House of Northern Territory
Queensland, 1st Government House of Queensland, 2nd Government House of Queensland
South Australia, Government House of South Australia
Tasmania, Government House of Tasmania
Victoria, Government House of Victoria
Western Australia, Government House of Western Australia

New Zealand
New Zealand, Government Houses of New Zealand

Auckland, Old Government House, Government House of Auckland
Wellington, Government House of Wellington

South Pacific

Cook Islands, Government House of the Cook Islands
Fiji, Government House of Fiji
Gilbert and Ellice Islands, Government House of Gilbert & Ellice Islands
Nauru, Government House of Nauru
Niue, Government House of Niue
Norfolk Island, Government House of Norfolk Island
Papua New Guinea, Government House of Papua New Guinea
Pitcairn Islands, Government House of Pitcairn Islands
Solomon Islands, Government House of Solomon Islands
Tonga, Government House of Tonga
Vanuatu, Government House of Vanuatu
Western Samoa, Government House of Western Samoa

See also
Official residence
Government House
List of British Empire-related topics